= Tom Langridge =

Australian soccer coach

Personal information
- Full name: Tom Langridge

Managerial career
- Years: Team
- 1947: Australia

Tom Langridge (fl. 1947) was an association football manager of the 1940s.

In 1947, he was manager of the Australian national team in a game against South Africa. The match, which was the last in a series of five, took place in Sydney and ended in a 2–1 loss for the Australians.

== Managerial statistics ==
Team	From	To	Record				
Team	From	To	G	W	D	L	Win %
Australia	1947	1954	1	0	0	1	0.00
